Erythroneurini is a leafhopper tribe in the subfamily Typhlocybinae, with over 200 genera.

Genera 

 Aaka Dworakowska, 1972
 Accacidia Dworakowska, 1971
 Ahmedra Dworakowska & Viraktamath, 1979
 Aidola Melichar, 1914
 Aisa Dworakowska, 1979
 Ajika Dworakowska, 1979
 Alerrawia Dmitriev, 2016
 Alnetoidia Dlabola, 1958
 Amazygina Dietrich & Dmitriev, 2006
 Ambara Dworakowska, 1981
 Andrabia Ahmed, 1970
 Anufrievia Dworakowska, 1970
 Anzygina Fletcher & Larivière, 2009
 Arboridia Zachvatkin, 1946
 Arbosiria Dworakowska, 1994
 Asianidia Zachvatkin, 1946
 Assina Dworakowska, 1979
 Aylala Dworakowska, 1994
 Aztegina Dietrich & Dmitriev, 2006
 Bakera Mahmood, 1967
 Bakshia Dworakowska, 1977
 Balanda Dworakowska, 1979
 Barinaga Dworakowska, 1995
 Baya Dworakowska, 1972
 Bengueta Mahmood, 1967
 Bogorya Dworakowska, 2011
 Borsukia Dworakowska, 2011
 Cassianeura Ramakrishnan & Menon, 1973
 Cerkira Dworakowska, 1994
 Cerneura Ghauri, 1978
 Chagria Dworakowska, 1994
 Chikava Dworakowska, 1995
 Chujophila Dworakowska, 1997
 Ciudadrea Dworakowska, 1970
 Coganoa Dworakowska, 1976
 Coloana Dworakowska, 1971
 Cubnara Dworakowska, 1979
 Czarnastopa Dworakowska, 2011
 Damaniana Dmitriev & Dietrich, 2006
 Davmata Dworakowska, 1979
 Diomma Motschulsky, 1863
 Dipemura Dworakowska, 2011
 Dorycnia Dworakowska, 1972
 Duanjina Kuoh, 1981
 Elbelus Mahmood, 1967
 Eldama Dworakowska, 1972
 Empoascanara Distant, 1918
 Erasmoneura Young, 1952
 Eratoneura Young, 1952
 Eryascara Dworakowska, 1995
 Erythridula Young, 1952
 Erythroneura Fitch, 1851
 Eterna Dworakowska, 2011
 Fractata Song & Li, 2011
 Frutioidia Zachvatkin, 1946
 Gambialoa Dworakowska, 1972
 Georgetta Dworakowska, 2011
 Gindara Dworakowska, 1980
 Gladkara Dworakowska, 1995
 Goska Dworakowska, 1981
 Gredzinskiya Dworakowska, 1972
 Hajra Dworakowska, 1981
 Hamagina Dietrich & Dmitriev, 2006
 Hamata Cao, Dmitriev, Dietrich & Zhang, 2019
 Harmata Dworakowska, 1976
 Hauptidia Dworakowska, 1970
 Helionidia Zachvatkin, 1946
 Hepneriana Dworakowska, 1972
 Hepzygina Dietrich & Dmitriev, 2006
 Hymetta McAtee, 1919
 Ifeneura Ghauri, 1975
 Illinigina Dietrich & Dmitriev, 2006
 Imbecilla Dworakowska, 1970
 Imugina Mahmood, 1967
 Irenaneura Cao, Huang & Zhang, 2012
 Iseza Dworakowska, 1981
 Ivorycoasta Dworakowska, 1972
 Jalalia Ahmed, 1970
 Jotwa Dworakowska, 1995
 Kabakra Dworakowska, 1979
 Kadrabia Dworakowska & Sohi, 1978
 Kanguza Dworakowska, 1972
 Kapsa Dworakowska, 1972
 Kaukania Dworakowska, 1972
 Kelmensa Dworakowska, 2011
 Keuria Theron, 1988
 Koperta Dworakowska, 1972
 Kropka Dworakowska, 1970
 Kusala Dworakowska, 1981
 Kwempia Ahmed, 1979
 Laciniata Song & Li, 2013
 Lamtoana Dworakowska, 1972
 Lankama Dworakowska, 1994
 Lectotypella Dworakowska, 1972
 Leuconeura Ishihara, 1978
 Levigata Cao, Dmitriev, Dietrich & Zhang, 2019
 Lichtrea Dworakowska, 1976
 Lisciasta Dworakowska, 1995
 Lublinia Dworakowska, 1970
 Luvanda Dworakowska, 1995
 Makia Dmitriev & Dietrich, 2006
 Mandola Dworakowska & Viraktamath, 1975
 Mangganeura Ghauri, 1967
 Matsumurina Dworakowska, 1972
 Meremra Dworakowska & Viraktamath, 1979
 Mexigina Dietrich & Dmitriev, 2006
 Mfutila Dworakowska, 1974
 Mitjaevia Dworakowska, 1970
 Mizeria Dworakowska, 1994
 Molopopterus Jacobi, 1910
 Motaga Dworakowska, 1979
 Musbrnoia Dworakowska, 1972
 Nababia Dworakowska, 1994
 Nandara Dworakowska, 1984
 Napogina Dietrich & Dmitriev, 2006
 Nedotepa Dmitriev, 2016
 Negoneura McKamey, 2006
 Nelionidia Dietrich & Dmitriev, 2006
 Neoimbecilla Dietrich & Dmitriev, 2006
 Neolokia Dmitriev & Dietrich, 2006
 Neozygina Dietrich & Dmitriev, 2006
 Ngoma Dworakowska, 1974
 Ngombela Dworakowska, 1974
 Ngunga Dworakowska, 1974
 Niedoida Dworakowska, 1994
 Nitta Dworakowska, 1995
 Nkaanga Dworakowska, 1974
 Nkonba Dworakowska, 1974
 Nkumba Dworakowska, 1974
 Nsanga Dworakowska, 1974
 Nsesa Dworakowska, 1974
 Nsimbala Dworakowska, 1974
 Ntanga Dworakowska, 1974
 Ntotila Dworakowska, 1974
 Nzinga Dworakowska, 1974
 Olszewskia Dworakowska, 1974
 Ossuaria Dworakowska, 1979
 Otbatara Dworakowska, 1984
 Parathaia Kuoh, 1982
 Pasara Dworakowska, 1981
 Penangiana Mahmood, 1967
 Perugina Dietrich & Dmitriev, 2006
 Pettya Kirkaldy, 1906
 Plumosa Sohi, 1977
 Proskura Dworakowska, 1981
 Pseudothaia Kuoh, 1982
 Punctigerella Vilbaste, 1968
 Qadria Mahmood, 1967
 Raabeina Dworakowska, 1972
 Ramania Dworakowska, 1972
 Ranbara Dworakowska, 1983
 Ratburella Ramakrishnan & Menon, 1973
 Ratjalia Dworakowska, 1981
 Ratsiraka Dworakowska, 1997
 Rhusia Theron, 1977
 Rolwalia Thapa, 1989
 Rossmoneura Dietrich & Dmitriev, 2006
 Rufitidia Dworakowska, 1994
 Saccata Cao & Zhang, 2013
 Sajda Dworakowska, 1981
 Salka Dworakowska, 1972
 Sanatana Dworakowska, 1984
 Sandanella Mahmood, 1967
 Sempia Dworakowska, 1970
 Seriana Dworakowska, 1971
 Singapora Mahmood, 1967
 Sirosoma McAtee, 1933
 Ska Dworakowska, 1976
 Songana Song & Li, 2017
 Spinigina Dietrich & Dmitriev, 2006
 Stehliksia Dworakowska, 1972
 Szymczakowskia Dworakowska, 1974
 Tamaricella Zachvatkin, 1946
 Tautoneura Anufriev, 1969
 Thaia Ghauri, 1962
 Thailus Mahmood, 1967
 Thaioneura Song, Li & Dietrich, 2016
 Thaiora Dworakowska, 1995
 Thapaia Dmitriev & Dietrich, 2006
 Thecana Thapa, 1989
 Theroniana Dmitriev & Dietrich, 2006
 Toroa Ahmed, 1979
 Tuzinka Dworakowska & Viraktamath, 1979
 Undulivena Song & Li, 2019
 Urmila Dworakowska, 1981
 Variolosa Cao & Zhang, 2013
 Vermara Dworakowska, 1980
 Vrba Dworakowska, 1997
 Watara Dworakowska, 1977
 Witera Dworakowska, 1981
 Yakuza Dworakowska, 2002
 Yeia Dworakowska, 1995
 Zadra Dworakowska, 1997
 Zanjoneura Ghauri, 1974
 Ziczacella Anufriev, 1970
 Zinga Dworakowska, 1972
 Zygina Fieber, 1866
 Zyginama Dietrich & Dmitriev, 2006
 Zyginidia Haupt, 1929
 Zyginopsis Ramakrishnan & Menon, 1973

References

External links 

 
Typhlocybinae
Hemiptera tribes